= Charles C Marto =

- Occupations: Producer and executive
- Known for: Emmy Award-winning work
- Notable work: The Concert For World Children's Day

Charles C Marto is an American producer and executive. He is the current president of VOLO Events.

== Early life and career ==
As a producer, Marto is the recipient of the primetime Emmy Award for his film, The Concert For World Children's Day.

As an executive, Marto has served as a chief executive officer of PlantGarden.

He is also the founder of VOLO Events.
